Tyler Joseph Beede (born May 23, 1993) is an American professional baseball pitcher for the Yomiuri Giants of Nippon Professional Baseball (NPB). The Toronto Blue Jays selected him in the first round, with the 21st overall selection, of the 2011 MLB draft, but he turned down a $2.5 million signing bonus to instead attend Vanderbilt University. He played college baseball for the Vanderbilt Commodores, and was drafted by the San Francisco Giants as the 14th pick in the first round of the 2014 MLB draft. Beede made his MLB debut in 2018.

Early life
Beede first attended hometown Auburn High School, in Massachusetts. In 2009, as a sophomore, he helped them win the Division 2 state title, as he was 7–1 with an 0.88 ERA, with 114 strikeouts in 56.1 innings.

Beede then transferred to Lawrence Academy at Groton in Groton, Massachusetts. In 2010 he went 14–1 with an 0.80 ERA and 189 strikeouts in 96.1 innings. The following spring he went 8–0 with an 0.69 ERA, and 102 strikeouts, 8 walks, and 13 hits in 51 innings.  His fastball reached 92–94 mph.

The Toronto Blue Jays selected him in the first round, with the 21st overall selection, of the 2011 Major League Baseball draft. However, he decided not to sign, turning down a $2.5 million signing bonus, to instead attend Vanderbilt University to play college baseball for the Vanderbilt Commodores. He was the only first round pick that year not to sign.

College career
As a freshman at Vanderbilt in 2012, Beede had a 1–5 win–loss record with a 4.52 earned run average (ERA) and 68 strikeouts in 71.2 innings. He was named to the All-Southeastern Conference freshman team.

Beede started his sophomore season in 2013 winning his first 14 starts. He finished the season 14–1 (leading the Southeastern Conference in wins, and a school record) with a 2.32 ERA, 103 strikeouts (3rd) in 101 innings, and 5.9 hits per 9 innings (8th). He was one of three finalists for the Golden Spikes Award and a finalist for the  Dick Howser Trophy. After the season, he was selected by USA Baseball to play for the United States collegiate national team during the summer. As a junior in 2014 he was 8–8 (with his 8 wins 9th in the Conference) with a 4.04 ERA and 116 strikeouts (2nd) in 113.1 innings, and helped Vanderbilt win the College World Series.

Professional career

Draft and minor leagues
The San Francisco Giants selected Beede in the first round, 14th overall, of the 2014 Major League Baseball draft, and he signed for a $2,613,200 signing bonus.  He made his professional debut with the Arizona Giants of the Rookie-level Arizona League in 2014, and after giving up three runs in  innings along with striking out 11, he was promoted to the Salem-Keizer Volcanoes of the Class A-Short Season Northwest League, where he finished the season with a 2.70 ERA and 7 strikeouts in  innings.

He started 2015 with the San Jose Giants of the Class A-Advanced California League, before being promoted to the Richmond Flying Squirrels of the Class AA Eastern League in June. In 22 total games started between both teams, he pitched to a 5–10 record and 3.97 ERA in 124.2 innings along with a 1.26 WHIP. He was a California League mid-season All Star, and Baseball America ranked him the # 2 prospect of the Giants.

Beede spent the 2016 season with Richmond, finishing with an 8–7 record and 2.81 ERA, the lowest in the Eastern League, and 135 strikeouts (2nd in the league) along with 14 wild pitches (tops in the league) in 147.1 innings. He was an Eastern League mid-season All Star, and an MiLB Organization All Star.

In 2017, he played for the Sacramento River Cats of the Class AAA Pacific Coast League, where he posted a 6–7 record with a 4.79 ERA in 109 innings in 19 games started. The Giants added Beede to their 40-man roster after the 2017 season.

San Francisco Giants (2018–2019, 2021–2022)
The Giants promoted Beede to the major leagues on April 10, 2018 and he made his major league debut the same night at AT&T Park against the Arizona Diamondbacks. He started the game and pitched four innings, giving up two earned runs and three hits while striking out three and walking five while not receiving a decision in an eventual 5–4 win. He pitched 7.2 innings in two games for the season with the Giants.

In 2019 with AAA Sacramento he was 2–2 with a 2.34 ERA in seven starts in which he pitched 34.2 innings and struck out 49 batters (12.7 strikeouts per 9 innings). Called up, on June 17, 2019, Beede earned his first major league win in a 3–2 win over the Los Angeles Dodgers, pitching six innings and allowing just one run on three hits. In 2019 with the Giants he was 5–10 with a 5.08 ERA in 24 games (22 starts) in which he had 113 strikeouts (7th among NL rookies) in  117 innings.

In March 2020, Beede had Tommy John surgery. Beede missed the 2020 season as a result.

On February 26, 2021, Beede was placed on the 60-day injured list as he continued to recover from Tommy John surgery. On July 6, Beede was activated from the injured list.

In the 2021 regular season for the Giants, Beede pitched one inning in one game, giving up three earned runs. Pitching for AAA Sacramento, he was 0–6 with a 6.66 ERA, as in 16 starts he pitched 42.2 innings, striking out 50 batters.

Beede made 6 appearances for San Francisco in 2022, working to a 4.66 ERA with 4 strikeouts in 9.2 innings pitched. On May 5, 2022, Beede was designated for assignment by San Francisco.

Pittsburgh Pirates (2022)
On May 12, 2022, Beede was claimed off waivers by the Pittsburgh Pirates. On September 15, Beede was designated for assignment.

Yomiuri Giants
On November 25, 2022, Beede signed with the Yomiuri Giants of Nippon Professional Baseball.

Personal life
Beede's father, Walter, was drafted by the Chicago Cubs out of high school in the 13th round of the 1981 major league draft as a first baseman, and played a year in the minor leagues.  He coached at Becker College in Worcester, Massachusetts, from 2001 to 2008.

Beede married actress Allie DeBerry in November 2017.

See also
List of baseball players who underwent Tommy John surgery

References

External links

Vanderbilt Commodores bio

1993 births
Living people
People from Auburn, Massachusetts
Sportspeople from Worcester County, Massachusetts
Baseball players from Massachusetts
Major League Baseball pitchers
All-American college baseball players
San Francisco Giants players
Pittsburgh Pirates players
Vanderbilt Commodores baseball players
Arizona League Giants players
Salem-Keizer Volcanoes players
San Jose Giants players
Richmond Flying Squirrels players
Sacramento River Cats players
Scottsdale Scorpions players